The Dogs Act 1871 (34 & 35 Vict c 56) is an Act of the Parliament of the United Kingdom which deals with the handling of stray and dangerous dogs.

Section 1 of the Act dealt with stray dogs - this section was repealed by the Dogs Act 1906.

Section 2 is the only part still in force: it says that if a magistrates' court receives a complaint that a dog is dangerous, the court can order the dog to be destroyed, or it can order the owner to keep the dog under proper control, and if that order isn't followed, the court can impose a fine.

Section 3 dealt with rabid dogs - this part was repealed by the Rabies Act 1974.

See also
Dogs Act

References
"The Dogs Act, 1871". Halsbury's Statutes of England. (The Complete Statutes of England). First Edition. Butterworth & Co (Publishers) Ltd. 1929. [ Volume 1]. Page 346 et seq. See also the "Preliminary Note" to "Animals" at page 341 and passim. Google Books:  . Second Edition. Volume 1. Page 863.
Lely, John Mounteney. The Statutes of Practical Utilty. (Chitty's Statutes). Fifth Edition. Sweet and Maxwell. Stevens and Sons. Chancery Lane, London. 1894. Volume 3. Title "Dogs". Pages 6 to 9.
Lely, John Mounteney. Chitty's Collection of Statutes of Practical Utility. Fourth Edition. Henry Sweet. Stevens and Sons. Chancery Lane, London. 1880. Volume 2. Pages 664 to 666.
Paterson, William (ed). "Dogs Act". The Practical Statutes of the Session 1871. Horace Cox. Wellington Street, Strand, London. 1871. Pages 142 to 148.
"The Law and the Lawyers" (1885 to 1886) The Law Times 21, 128, 203 
"The Dog Regulations and the Dog Owners" (1886) 21 The Law Journal 527 (18 September). See also pages 39, 525, 531 and 586.

United Kingdom Acts of Parliament 1871
Dog law in the United Kingdom
Animal welfare and rights legislation in the United Kingdom